Slovenská Nová Ves is a village and municipality of Trnava District in the Trnava region of Slovakia.

References

External links
http://www.statistics.sk/mosmis/eng/run.html
http://en.e-obce.sk/obec/slovenskanovaves/slovenska-nova-ves.html

Villages and municipalities in Trnava District